Judisk Krönika ("Jewish Chronicle") is a Jewish magazine based in Stockholm, Sweden. Published on a bimonthly basis with six issues a year, the magazine's circulation was around 6,500 copies in 2000. The editor in chief since 2015 is Anneli Rådestad.

History and profile
The journal was founded in 1932 by Daniel Brick and Simon Brick. Judisk Tidskrift and the journal had high readership levels among the Jewish origin Swedes during the 1940s and 1950s. Judisk Krönika published continuously about anti-Jewish developments from early 1933 and throughout the entire period of Nazi terror.

In 1979, the Jewish assemblies and Jewish organizations in Sweden took over responsibility for the magazine, which then became the main information channel of Judaism in Sweden. In 1988, Stiftelsen Judisk Krönika ("Judisk Krönika Foundation") was founded, which functions as the publisher.

References

External links
 Judisk Krönika, official website
Judisk Krönika in Historical Jewish Press - searchable archives of the magazine (dating back to 1932)

1932 establishments in Sweden
Bi-monthly magazines published in Sweden
Jewish magazines
Jewish Swedish history
Jews and Judaism in Stockholm
Magazines established in 1932
Magazines published in Stockholm
Swedish-language magazines
Zionism in Sweden